Solamargine is a cytotoxic chemical compound that occurs in plants of the family Solanaceae, such as potatoes, tomatoes, and eggplants. It has been also isolated from Solanum nigrum fungal endophyte Aspergillus flavus. It is a glycoalkaloid derived from the steroidal alkaloid solasodine.

Solamargine was one component of the unsuccessful experimental cancer drug candidate Coramsine.

See also 
 Solanum americanum

References

External links

Steroidal alkaloids
Alkaloid glycosides
Plant toxins
Steroidal alkaloids found in Solanaceae